Betul Assembly constituency is one of the 230 Vidhan Sabha (Legislative Assembly) constituencies of Madhya Pradesh state in central India.

Members of Legislative Assembly

 1951: Deepchand Gothi, Indian National Congress
 1957: Deepchand Gothi and Mokham Singh, both from Indian National Congress
 1962: Deepchand Gothi, Indian National Congress
 1967: G. Khandelwal, Bharatiya Jana Sangh
 1972: Maruti Narayanrao, Indian National Congress
 1977: Madhav Gopal Naseri, Independent
 1980: Madhev Gopal Naseri, Bharatiya Janata Party
 1985: Ashok Sable, Indian National Congress
 1990: Bhagwat Patel, Bharatiya Janata Party
 1993: Ashok Sable, Indian National Congress
 1998: Vinod Daga, Indian National Congress
 2003: Shiv Prasad Rathore, Bharatiya Janata Party
 2008: Alkesh Arya, Bharatiya Janata Party
 2013: Hemant Khandelwal, Bharatiya Janata Party

See also

 Betul, Madhya Pradesh
 Betul (Lok Sabha constituency)

References

Assembly constituencies of Madhya Pradesh
Betul, Madhya Pradesh
Betul district